Arias is a genus of moths in the family Saturniidae first described by Claude Lemaire in 1995.

Species
Arias inbio Lemaire, 1995

References

Hemileucinae
Moth genera